Aculepeira packardi is a species of orb weaver in the spider family Araneidae. It is found in North America, Russia, China, and Kazakhstan.

References

External links

 

Aculepeira
Articles created by Qbugbot
Spiders described in 1875